Modus is a Swedish television psychological thriller series, directed by Lisa Siwe and Mani Maserrat, based upon the novel Frukta inte by Norwegian author and lawyer Anne Holt and adapted for television by Emmy Award winning writers Mai Brostrøm and Peter Thorsboe. The series follows the work of Inger Johanne Vik (Melinda Kinnaman), a Swedish criminal psychologist and profiler, who has previously assisted both the Swedish police and the FBI in the United States.

The first eight-part series was premièred on TV4 in September 2015. A second eight-part series, written in Swedish and English, was filmed in 2017, with Kim Cattrall and Greg Wise among the new cast members for this series. This series began broadcasting on TV4 on 2 November 2017.

Synopsis 
In the first series, Inger Johanne's eldest daughter, Stina, who is autistic, unwittingly witnesses a contract killing when the family attend a wedding at a local hotel. The murderer surprisingly saves Stina's life, without giving away his identity. Inger decides to return to work with police detective Ingvar Nyman to assist in solving the crime. They discover that they are pursuing a hit man, working for an American religious sect.

In the second series, President of the United States Helen Tyler goes missing during a state visit to Sweden. Inger Johanne is partnered with Nyman and detailed to work with Warren Schifford, an FBI agent and Special Advisor to the president, to investigate. Vik and Schifford have history, dating from her time with the FBI.

Cast
 Melinda Kinnaman as Inger Johanne Vik; criminal psychologist and profiler
 Henrik Norlén as Ingvar Nymann; police inspector
 Esmeralda Struwe as Stina Vik; Inger's elder daughter
 Simon J. Berger as Isak Aronson; Inger's ex-husband and the father of her two daughters
 Annika Hallin as Hedvig Nyström; police pathologist
 Gerhard Hoberstorfer as Bo Sundberg; police detective
 Björn Andersson as Alfred Nyman; Ingvar's father
 Lily Wahlsteen as Linnea Vik; Inger's younger daughter

Series 1 (2015)

 Marek Oravec as Richard Forrester
 Magnus Roosmann as Marcus Ståhl  
 Peter Jöback as Rolf Ljungberg
 Johan Widerberg as Lukas Lindgren  
 Krister Henriksson as Erik Lindgren  
 Liv Mjönes as Patricia Green
 Cecilia Nilsson as Elisabeth Lindgren  
 Josefine Tengblad as Sophie Dahlberg
 Ellen Mattsson as Astrid Friberg  
 Primus Lind as Noah Ståhl
 Eva Melander as Marianne Larsson
 Julia Dufvenius as Isabella Levin
 Simon Norrthon as Lennart Carlsson
 Stephen Rappaport as Jacob Lindstrom 
 Christoffer Jareståhl as Robin Larsson
 Anki Lidén as Gunilla Larsson
 Philip Martin as Hakim Hammar

Series 2 (2017)

 Kim Cattrall as Helen Tyler; the President of the United States 
 Greg Wise as Warren Schifford; an FBI agent and Senior Advisor
 Martin Marquez as Hunter Russell; Secret Service Agent 
 Lachele Carl as Lori Reed; United States Ambassador to Sweden 
 Billy Campbell as Dale Tyler; First Gentleman
 Emilia Poma as Zoe Tyler; First Daughter 
 Paprika Steen as Alva Roos; Chief Inspector 
 Johan Rabaeus as Harald Bohman; Prime Minister of Sweden 
 Bijan Daneshmand as Mahmoud Muntasir; an oil industry billionaire 
 Samuel Fröler as Torbjörn Skoglund 
 Anja Lundqvist as Jessica Östlund 
 Lo Kauppi as Linda Clason 
 Nina Zanjani as Philippa 
 Christopher Wollter as Tobias Magnusson
 Sigge Eklund as Gustav
 Jonas Malmsjö as Oscar Ek 
 Sasha Behar as Raja Cooper

Episodes

Series 1 (2015)

Series 2 (2017)

References

External links

Swedish crime television series
Television shows set in Sweden
2015 Swedish television series debuts
Swedish-language television shows
Television series based on novels
Autism in television
Television series about presidents of the United States